Architect of the Silent Moment is an album led by jazz bassist Scott Colley which was recorded in 2005 and released by the CAM Jazz label in 2007.

Reception

The AllMusic review by Michael G. Nastos states "This is easily Colley's best recording of a small handful as a leader; it is a candidate for best jazz CD of 2007 and comes highly recommended".

On All About Jazz, John Kelman's review said "The beauty of Architect of the Silent Moment is its unequivocal sense of purpose, which avoids undue consideration and provides everyone with ample room to move".

JazzTimes's Thomas Conrad said "This is not an album that often settles into "solos." Colley creates shifting, intricate structures in which individual voices are embedded ... It is too early in the new year to vote, but Architect of the Silent Moment is on my working Top 10 list for 2007".

Track listing
All compositions by Scott Colley except where noted
 "Usual Illusion" – 7:43
 "Strip Mall Ballet" – 8:03
 "El Otro" – 2:59
 "Architect of the Silent Moment" – 7:23
 "Masoosong" – 6:15
 "Feign Tonal" – 3:06
 "From Within" – 8:17
 "Smoke Stack" (Andrew Hill) – 6:07
 "Window of Time" – 8:07

Personnel
Scott Colley − bass
Ralph Alessi – trumpet
Craig Taborn − piano, Rhodes piano, Hammond organ
Antonio Sánchez – drums

Special guests
David Binney – tenor saxophone
Jason Moran – piano
Gregoire Maret – harmonica
Adam Rogers – guitar

References

Scott Colley albums
2007 albums
CAM Jazz albums